Umarlai Khalsa  is a village in Barmer District of Rajasthan state in India. It is about 100 km from Jodhpur. The town is famous for farming, Mata Nagnechiyaa Temple and Akhada, The town is well connected with Jodhpur by buses at frequent intervals.  From Umarlai Khalsa towards Jalore there is India's Third Brahma Temple in the village of Asotra. From Umarlai Khalsa towards Barmer there is Ancient Temple of Lord Shri Vishnu named as Shri Ranchore Ray (first ranchore ray mandir of world), Khed Mandir in the village of Khed The name Umarlai Khalsa derived from all the religious people of this village. About 13 km from Balotra is located the famous Jain Temple Nakoda.  The place receives religious devotees from across India. The town is located near on the coast of the river Luni.
The village of Umarlai Khalsa is mainly popular for housing the famous Ancient Temples of Lord Shiva. It is one of the most revered pilgrimage destinations for the Hindu community. The temple is an excellent example of fine architecture and many sculptures are carved inside the temple. Apart from this temple, a number of other temples are located in the town which include the Pabuji Rathord Mandir, Jog Maya Matha Mandir, Gogaji Mandir, Bhomiyaji Mandir, Hanuman Mandir and more.

With gradually changing time, the historical Village of Umarlai Khalsa has emerged as a leading and developing village in western Rajasthan. Many schools, modern equipments of farming, Average standard of living, excellent transportation system, global connectivity and give it a view of some developed village feel.

The village of Umarlai Khalsa is well connected with all the major cities of India through road transportation. The nearest airport is located in Jodhpur which is just 100 km from here.

Geography 
Balotra is located at  It has an average elevation of 105 metres (345 feet).

Umarlai Khalsa situated near to Pakistan border in the district of Barmer. It is also near to the famous city called Jodhpur.

Demographics 
 India census, Umarlai Khalsa had a population of 2,307. Males constitute 50.97% of the population and females 49.02%.  Umarlai Khalsa has an average literacy rate of 45.3%.

Temple 

 Dangi's Kuldevi Temple
 Ramdev Ji Temple
 Pabuji Rathore Ka Mandir
 Shiv Temple
 Hanuman Ji Temple
 Bayosaa Temple
 Sati Mata

References

External links 
 Official Site

Villages in Barmer district